This article explains the transcription of the Japanese language in the Esperanto alphabet. Esperantists often use non-Esperanto transcriptions, such as Hepburn and Kunrei. However, the need for a transcription in the Esperanto alphabet is essential for non-Japanese speaking Esperantists to be able to pronounce words.

Summary 
There are two well-known transcription systems of Japanese in Latin alphabet: Hepburn and Kunrei. However, there is no official Esperanto transcription for Japanese. This page presents one of the unofficial methods of transcription.

Transcription 
Most books on Esperanto published in Japan provide tables for transcription. In 2012, a book by Kenichi Fujimaki, called Marugoto-esuperanto-bunpō-kaichōban まるごとエスペラント文法 改訂版 (lit. Revised Esperanto Grammar). explains one way of transcription, however, as far as 1923, Yoshimi Ishiguro writes his Shotō esuperanto kyōkasho 初等エスペラント教科書 (lit. Beginning Esperanto Textbook), explaining a transcription, however the remaining digital copies of his works are barely readable, so they are not included in this article.

Double consonant 
The symbol "っ" / "ッ" (small "つ" [tsu]) is not actually transcribed, but instead, indicated by doubling the following consonant. Example: Sapporo (さっぽろ).

According to Hepburn:
c → tc (ts → tts)
ĉ → tĉ (ch → tch)
ŝ → sŝ (sh → ssh)

According to Kunrei:
c → cc (t → tt)
ĉ → ĉĉ (ty → tty)
ŝ → ŝŝ (sy → ssy)

Long vowels 
These are various methods of transcribing the word とうきょう (Tokyo)
 Tōkjō : Indicated by a macron.
 Tokjo : No indication.
 Tôkjô : Indicated by a Circumflex.
 Toukjou or Toŭkjoŭ: Indicated by the use of an ou for a long o sound, and a ŭ for a long u sound.
 Tookjoo: Indicated by doubling the vowels.

Diphthongs 
The Japanese vowel i is changed to j and the vowel u is changed to ŭ for Esperanto transcription.
 ai → aj
 ei → ej
 oi → oj
 ui → uj
 au → aŭ
 eu → eŭ
 ou → oŭ
 ue → ŭe

Consonants 
If there is a じ (ji) before an ん (n) in a word, you must write it as ĝi. Otherwise, you can use either ĵi or ĝi.
 "Ĝiŝin" (じしん, earthquakes)
 "Buridĝi" (ブリッジ, Contract bridge)
 "Kanĝi" (かんじ, kanji)
 "Fuĵi-san" (ふじさん, Fuji, Note: さん is a separate word, so you can use a ĵ)
When the syllable ず/づ is used at the beginning of a word, it is mostly transcribed as dzu, directly from Hepburn; but if the syllable is anywhere else in the word, it is mostly transcribed as zu.
 Kazu (かず, number)
 Manazuru (まなづる)
 Dzuke (づけ)
 Dzumen (ずめん, drawing)

Voiceless vowels 
Generally, some vowels may not be said at all. This is very common in everyday speech in Japanese
 Shita → Ŝta (した)
 Desu　→ Des (です)

Red letters indicate Kana no longer used in modern Japanese.

See also 
Esperantigo de vortoj el japana fonto
Romanization of Japanese
Hepburn romanization
Kunrei-shiki romanization

External links 
Baza Esperanto-lekciono por (japanaj) retmarŝantoj
Konsiloj por transskribado el la japana al Esperanto

References



Romanization of Japanese
Esperanto